Protohelius is a genus of crane fly in the family Limoniidae.

Distribution
Venezuela, Ecuador, India, China & Taiwan

Species
P. cisatlanticus Alexander, 1938
P. issikii Alexander, 1928
P. khasicus Alexander, 1964
P. nigricolor Alexander, 1940
P. nilgiricus Alexander, 1960
P. tinkhami Alexander, 1938
P. venezolanus Alexander, 1950

References

Limoniidae
Diptera of South America
Diptera of Asia